The Din Pedals is the major label debut album by American alternative rock band The Din Pedals. Shortly after it was released by Epic Records in February 1998, the band broke up.

Background
Tracks 1, 3, 4, 9 and 10 were re-recorded from prior independent albums the band had released between 1995–1996, while the rest of the album consisted of new songs they wrote after getting signed to Epic Records in 1997.

Appearances in other media
In 1997, the song "Waterfall" appeared on the soundtrack for the slasher film I Know What You Did Last Summer, as well as briefly appearing within the film itself. The song was also featured on a 1999 episode of the show Dawson's Creek.

Reception

Tom Demalon of AllMusic gave the album a three-star rating. He compared the album's vocals to Bono of U2. He also made comparisons to British band Radiohead, specifically on the closing track "Plastic", noting that "the line referring to 'blow through the ceiling' in the same song echoes a similar line in Radiohead's "Fake Plastic Trees."" However, he concludes his review by stating that "The music is dynamic [...] and the Din Pedals are a band worth watching. They have a solid blueprint and it will be interesting to see if they can create something a bit more their own."

Track listing

References

1998 albums
Epic Records albums